Mark Kingsland (born 14 July 1970) is an Australian former cyclist. He competed in the individual pursuit at the 1992 Summer Olympics.

References

External links
 

1970 births
Living people
Australian male cyclists
Olympic cyclists of Australia
Cyclists at the 1992 Summer Olympics
Place of birth missing (living people)
Commonwealth Games medallists in cycling
Commonwealth Games silver medallists for Australia
Cyclists at the 1990 Commonwealth Games
20th-century Australian people
21st-century Australian people
Medallists at the 1990 Commonwealth Games